Hendrik Weydandt (born 16 July 1995) is a German professional footballer who plays as a forward for Hannover 96.

Career
Weydandt made his professional debut for Hannover 96 on 19 August 2018, appearing in the first round of the 2018–19 DFB-Pokal against 3. Liga side Karlsruher SC. He was substituted on in the 82nd minute for Niclas Füllkrug, and scored the final two goals in the 85th and 90th minutes in the 6–0 away win. On 25 August, he scored on his Bundesliga debut in a 1–1 draw to Werder Bremen after coming on as a substitute.

References

External links
 
 

1995 births
Living people
People from Gehrden
Footballers from Lower Saxony
German footballers
Association football forwards
Hannover 96 II players
Hannover 96 players
Regionalliga players
Bundesliga players
1. FC Germania Egestorf/Langreder players
2. Bundesliga players